The term macromolecular assembly (MA) refers to massive chemical structures such as viruses and non-biologic nanoparticles, cellular organelles and membranes and ribosomes, etc. that are complex mixtures of polypeptide, polynucleotide, polysaccharide or other polymeric macromolecules.  They are generally of more than one of these types, and the mixtures are defined spatially (i.e., with regard to their chemical shape), and with regard to their underlying chemical composition and structure. Macromolecules are found in living and nonliving things, and are composed of many hundreds or thousands of atoms held together by covalent bonds; they are often characterized by repeating units (i.e., they are polymers). Assemblies of these can likewise be biologic or non-biologic, though the MA term is more commonly applied in biology, and the term supramolecular assembly is more often applied in non-biologic contexts (e.g., in supramolecular chemistry and nanotechnology). MAs of macromolecules are held in their defined forms by non-covalent intermolecular interactions (rather than covalent bonds), and can be in either non-repeating structures (e.g., as in the ribosome (image) and cell membrane architectures), or in repeating linear, circular, spiral, or other patterns (e.g., as in actin filaments and the flagellar motor, image). The process by which MAs are formed has been termed molecular self-assembly, a term especially applied in non-biologic contexts. A wide variety of physical/biophysical, chemical/biochemical, and computational methods exist for the study of MA; given the scale (molecular dimensions) of MAs, efforts to elaborate their composition and structure and discern mechanisms underlying their functions are at the forefront of modern structure science.

Biomolecular complex

A biomolecular complex, also called a biomacromolecular complex, is any biological complex made of more than one biopolymer (protein, RNA, DNA,

carbohydrate) or large non-polymeric biomolecules (lipid). The interactions between these biomolecules are non-covalent.

Examples:
 Protein complexes, some of which are multienzyme complexes: proteasome, DNA polymerase III holoenzyme, RNA polymerase II holoenzyme, symmetric viral capsids, chaperonin complex GroEL-GroES, photosystem I, ATP synthase, ferritin.
 RNA-protein complexes: ribosome, spliceosome, vault, SnRNP. Such complexes in cell nucleus are called ribonucleoproteins (RNPs).
 DNA-protein complexes: nucleosome.
 Protein-lipid complexes: lipoprotein.

The biomacromolecular complexes are studied structurally by X-ray crystallography, NMR spectroscopy of proteins, cryo-electron microscopy and successive single particle analysis, and electron tomography.

The atomic structure models obtained by X-ray crystallography and biomolecular NMR spectroscopy can be docked into the much larger structures of biomolecular complexes obtained by lower resolution techniques like electron microscopy, electron tomography, and small-angle X-ray scattering.

Complexes of macromolecules occur ubiquitously in nature, where they are involved in the construction of viruses and all living cells. In addition, they play fundamental roles in all basic life processes (protein translation, cell division, vesicle trafficking, intra- and inter-cellular exchange of material between compartments, etc.). In each of these roles, complex mixtures of become organized in specific structural and spatial ways.  While the individual macromolecules are held together by a combination of covalent bonds and intramolecular non-covalent forces (i.e., associations between parts within each molecule, via charge-charge interactions, van der Waals forces, and dipole-dipole interactions such as hydrogen bonds), by definition MAs themselves are held together solely via the noncovalent forces, except now exerted between molecules (i.e., intermolecular interactions).

MA scales and examples 

The images above give an indication of the compositions and scale (dimensions) associated with MAs, though these just begin to touch on the complexity of the structures; in principle, each living cell is composed of MAs, but is itself an MA as well. In the examples and other such complexes and assemblies, MAs are each often millions of daltons in molecular weight (megadaltons, i.e., millions of times the weight of a single, simple atom), though still having measurable component ratios (stoichiometries) at some level of precision.  As alluded to in the image legends, when properly prepared, MAs or component subcomplexes of MAs can often be crystallized for study by protein crystallography and related methods, or studied by other physical methods (e.g., spectroscopy, microscopy).

Virus structures were among the first studied MAs; other biologic examples include ribosomes (partial image above), proteasomes, and translation complexes (with protein and nucleic acid components), procaryotic and eukaryotic transcription complexes, and nuclear and other biological pores that allow material passage between cells and cellular compartments. Biomembranes are also generally considered MAs, though the requirement for structural and spatial definition is modified to accommodate the inherent molecular dynamics of membrane lipids, and of proteins within lipid bilayers.

Virus assembly

During assembly of the bacteriophage (phage) T4 virion, the morphogenetic proteins encoded by the phage genes interact with each other in a characteristic sequence.  Maintaining an appropriate balance in the amounts of each of these proteins produced during viral infection appears to be critical for normal phage T4 morphogenesis.  Phage T4 encoded proteins that determine virion structure include major structural components, minor structural components and non-structural proteins that catalyze specific steps in the morphogenesis sequence

Research into MAs 
The study of MA structure and function is challenging, in particular because of their megadalton size, but also because of their complex compositions and varying dynamic natures.  Most have had standard chemical and biochemical methods applied (methods of protein purification and centrifugation, chemical and electrochemical characterization, etc.).  In addition, their methods of study include modern proteomic approaches, computational and atomic-resolution structural methods (e.g., X-ray crystallography), small-angle X-ray scattering (SAXS) and small-angle neutron scattering (SANS), force spectroscopy, and transmission electron microscopy and cryo-electron microscopy. Aaron Klug was recognized with the 1982 Nobel Prize in Chemistry for his work on structural elucidation using electron microscopy, in particular for protein-nucleic acid MAs including the tobacco mosaic virus (a structure containing a 6400 base ssRNA molecule and >2000 coat protein molecules). The crystallization and structure solution for the ribosome, MW ~ 2.5 MDa, an example of part of the protein synthetic 'machinery' of living cells, was object of the 2009 Nobel Prize in Chemistry awarded to Venkatraman Ramakrishnan, Thomas A. Steitz, and Ada E. Yonath.

Non-biologic counterparts 
Finally, biology is not the sole domain of MAs.  The fields of supramolecular chemistry and nanotechnology each have areas that have developed to elaborate and extend the principles first demonstrated in biologic MAs. Of particular interest in these areas has been elaborating the fundamental processes of molecular machines, and extending known machine designs to new types and processes.

See also 
 Multi-state modeling of biomolecules
 Quaternary structure
 Multiprotein complex
 Organelle: the broadest definition of "organelle" includes not only membrane bound cellular structures, but also very large biomolecular complexes.
 Multi-state modeling of biomolecules

References

Further reading

General reviews

Reviews on particular MAs

Primary sources

Other sources

 Nobel Prizes in Chemistry (2012), The Nobel Prize in Chemistry 2009, Venkatraman Ramakrishnan, Thomas A. Steitz, Ada E. Yonath, The Nobel Prize in Chemistry 2009, accessed 13 June 2011.
 Nobel Prizes in Chemistry (2012), The Nobel Prize in Chemistry 1982, Aaron Klug, The Nobel Prize in Chemistry 1982, accessed 13 June 2011.

External links 
Beck Group (2019), Structure and function of large macromolecular assemblies (Beck group home page), Beck Group - Structure and function of large molecular assemblies - EMBL, accessed 13 June 2011.
DMA Group (2019), Dynamics of macromolecular assembly (DMA Group home page), Dynamics of Macromolecular Assembly Section | National Institute of Biomedical Imaging and Bioengineering, accessed 13 June 2011.

Molecular biology
Biochemistry